Dimension is the debut studio album by Japanese metalcore band Crystal Lake. It was released on 5 July 2006 through Imperium Recordings. It is the first and also the last album to feature their founding bassist Seiji Nagasawa before he left the band.

Background and promotion
On 5 July 2006, the band released the album through Imperium Recordings. After the release of the album, they went on the "Dimension Tour" in Japan.

Track listing

Personnel
Crystal Lake
 Kentaro Nishimura – lead vocals
 Yudai Miyamoto – lead guitar
 Shinya Hori – rhythm guitar
 Seiji Nagasawa – bass
 Yusuke Ishihara – drums

References

2006 debut albums
Crystal Lake (band) albums